The 1910 Oklahoma Sooners football team represented the University of Oklahoma as an independent during the 1910 college football season. In their sixth year under head coach Bennie Owen, the Sooners compiled a 4–2–1 record, and outscored their opponents by a combined total of 163 to 31.

Schedule

References

Oklahoma
Oklahoma Sooners football seasons
Oklahoma Sooners football